Cymothoida is the name of a suborder of isopod crustaceans with a mostly carnivorous or parasitic lifestyle. It contains more than 2,700 described species in four superfamilies. Members of the suborder are characterised by their specialised mouthparts which include a mandible with a tooth-like process which is adapted for cutting or slicing.

Classification
Cymothoida contains these superfamilies and families:

Superfamily Anthuroidea Leach, 1814
Antheluridae Poore & Lew Ton, 1988
Anthuridae Leach, 1814
Expanathuridae Poore, 2001
Hyssuridae Wägele, 1981
Leptanthuridae Poore, 2001
Paranthuridae Menzies & Glynn, 1968
Superfamily Cymothooidea Leach, 1814
Aegidae White, 1850
Anuropidae Stebbing, 1893
Barybrotidae Hansen, 1890
Cirolanidae Dana, 1852
Corallanidae Hansen, 1890
Cymothoidae Leach, 1818
Gnathiidae Leach, 1814
Protognathiidae Wägele & Brandt, 1988
Tridentellidae Bruce, 1984

Infraorder Epicaridea
Superfamily Cryptoniscoidea Kossmann, 1880
Asconiscidae Bonnier, 1900 	 
Cabiropidae Giard & Bonnier, 1887 	 
Crinoniscidae Bonnier, 1900
Cryptoniscidae Kossmann, 1880 	 
Cyproniscidae Bonnier, 1900 	 
Dajidae Giard & Bonnier, 1887 (synonym: Colypuridae Richardson, 1905)
Entophilidae Richardson, 1903
Hemioniscidae Bonnier, 1900
Podasconidae Bonnier, 1900
Stellatoniscidae Oanh & Boyko, 2020
Superfamily Bopyroidea Rafinesque, 1815
Bopyridae Rafinesque, 1815 	 
Entoniscidae Kossmann, 1881
Ionidae H. Milne Edwards, 1840

References

 
Isopoda
Arthropod suborders